Year 1090 (MXC) was a common year starting on Tuesday (link will display the full calendar) of the Julian calendar.

Events 
 By place 

 Europe 
 A third Almoravid expedition is launched in Al-Andalus, designed to finally subdue the Taifa's Kingdoms. The cities of Córdoba, Seville, Granada, Málaga, Almería and Ronda fall to the troops of Sultan Yusuf ibn Tashfin.
 King Stephen II of Croatia becomes involved in an open conflict between factions of Croatian nobles, who reassert their traditional rights in their own counties.

 Seljuk Empire 
 Hassan-i Sabbah founds the Nizari Ismaili state after taking control of the Alamut Castle and organising the military group called the Order of Assassins.

 Africa 
 Béjaïa (or Bugia) becomes the capital of the Hammadid Dynasty in modern Algeria. It becomes an important port and centre of culture.

 By topic 

 Arts and Culture 
 Troubadours begin playing in western Aquitaine (Poitou and Saintonge) and Gascony (approximate date).

 Science and Technology 
 Qin Guan, Chinese poet of the Song Dynasty, writes the Can Shu (Book of Sericulture), which describes a silk-reeling machine that has the world's oldest known mechanical belt drive.

Births 
 January 17 – Qin Hui, Chinese chancellor (d. 1155)
unknown dates
 Frederick II (the One-Eyed), German nobleman (d. 1147)
 Fujiwara no Atsuyori (or Dōin), Japanese waka poet (d. 1179)
probable
 Agnes I, German abbess of Quedlinburg (approximate date)
 Alaungsithu, Burmese king of the Pagan Dynasty (d. 1167)
 Arnold of Brescia, Italian canon regular (approximate date)
 Bernard of Clairvaux, French abbot and theologian (d. 1153)
 Chen Yuyi, Chinese politician of the Song Dynasty (d. 1138)
 Eliezer ben Nathan, German rabbi and liturgical poet (d. 1170)
 Eric II (the Memorable), king of Denmark (approximate date)
 Fujiwara no Akisuke, Japanese nobleman and poet (d. 1155)
 Juliane de Fontevrault, illegitimate daughter of King Henry I of England
 Conrad I, German nobleman and rector of Burgundy (d. 1152)
 Niklot (or Nyklot), Obotrite prince and tribal chief (d. 1160)
 Robert FitzRoy, 1st Earl of Gloucester  
 Theobald II (the Great), French nobleman  
 Theobald of Bec, archbishop of Canterbury  
 William de Mohun, 1st Earl of Somerset

Deaths 
 March 22 – García II, king of Galicia and Portugal (b. 1042)
 April 16 – Sikelgaita, Lombard duchess of Apulia (b. 1040)
 May 3 – Adelaide of Rheinfelden, queen consort of Hungary
 May 12 – Liutold of Eppenstein, German nobleman
 May 18 – Berthold of Rheinfelden, German nobleman
 June 26 – Jaromír, Bohemian prince and bishop
 July 3 – Egbert II (or Ekbert), German nobleman
 August 11 – Fujiwara no Atsuie, Japanese nobleman (b. 1033)
 August 13 – Constance of Normandy, duchess of Brittany
unknown dates
 Abd al-Jalil ibn Wahbun, Moorish poet and writer
 Fayun Faxiu, Chinese Chan Buddhist monk (b. 1027)
 Richard fitz Gilbert, Norman nobleman (b. c.10350
 Guo Xi, Chinese landscape painter 
 St Isaiah of Rostov, Kievan missionary and bishop
 Raynald I, French Benedictine abbot (b. 1059)
 William of Poitiers, French priest and chronicler (b. c.1020)
probable
 Osbern of Canterbury, English hagiographer

References